The chestnut-breasted wren (Cyphorhinus thoracicus) is a species of bird in the family Troglodytidae. It is found in Colombia, Ecuador, Peru and Bolivia.

Taxonomy and systematics

The International Ornithological Committee (IOC), the Clements taxonomy, and the South American Classification Committee of the American Ornithological Society (SACC/AOS) treat the chestnut-breasted wren as one species with two subspecies, the nominate Cyphorhinus thoracicus thoracicus and C. t. dichrous. BirdLife International (BLI) treats them as separate species, the southern and northern chestnut-breasted wrens respectively.

Description

They appear very similar. The nominate adult has a sooty black crown, a rich dark brown back and rump, and a dark brown tail. C. t. dichrouss crown is black, its back and rump very dark brown, and its tail dark brown. Both have deep orange-brown faces, throat, and upper belly and dark brown flanks and lower belly. Both juveniles differ from the adults only in having a paler lower belly.

Distribution and habitat

The "northern" C. t. dichrous is found in the Western and Central Andes of Colombia and south through Ecuador into northern Peru. The "southern" C. t. thoracicus is found in central Peru and western Bolivia.

The chesnut-breasted wren inhabits wet montane forest including cloud forest with abundant epiphytes and moss.

Behavior

Feeding

The chestnut-breasted wren typically remains within  of the ground, foraging in leaf litter for invertebrates such as beetles and spiders. It hunts alone, in pairs, or in what are assumed to be small family groups. It only rarely joins mixed-species foraging flocks.

Breeding

Little is known about the chesnut-breasted wren's breeding phenology. Its nesting season appears to differ regionally; overall it is protracted. One nest in Peru has been photographed; it was a domed structure of mostly live material set very close to the ground. It contained two eggs.

Vocalization

The songs of the two chesnut-breasted wren subspecies differ significantly. That of the "southern" C. t. thoracicus is "a variable, musical and usually unhurried series...[of] fluted whistles that differ from each other in pitch, which are then followed by a faster-paced series of 5–11 short whistles...or by a much faster trilled tremolo." Its call is "a low, somewhat frog-like and wooden 'krol'". The song of C. t. dichrous is "a series of usually 3–4 ethereal, clear whistled notes" and its call "a harsh 'churr'".

Status

The IUCN treats the two subspecies separately and has assessed both as being of Least Concern. The species is quite common in parts of Colombia, scarce in Ecuador, uncommon to locally common in Peru, and rare to uncommon in Bolivia. It does occur in several protected areas.

References

Further reading

 

chestnut-breasted wren
Birds of the Northern Andes
chestnut-breasted wren
Taxonomy articles created by Polbot